The Military ranks of Bulgaria are the military insignia used by the Bulgarian Armed Forces.

Commissioned officer ranks
The rank insignia of commissioned officers.

Other ranks
The rank insignia of non-commissioned officers and enlisted personnel.

References

External links
 
 

Bulgaria
Military of Bulgaria